In mathematics, dimension theory is the study in terms of commutative algebra of the notion dimension of an algebraic variety (and by extension that of a scheme). The need of a theory for such an apparently simple notion results from the existence of many definitions of dimension that are equivalent only in the most regular cases (see Dimension of an algebraic variety). A large part of dimension theory consists in studying the conditions under which several dimensions are equal, and many important classes of commutative rings may be defined as the rings such that two dimensions are equal; for example, a regular ring is a commutative ring such that the homological dimension is equal to the Krull dimension.

The theory is simpler for commutative rings that are finitely generated algebras over a field, which are also quotient rings of polynomial rings in a finite number of indeterminates over a field. In this case, which is the algebraic counterpart of the case of affine algebraic sets, most of the definitions of the dimension are equivalent. For general commutative rings, the lack of geometric interpretation is an obstacle to the development of the theory; in particular, very little is known for non-noetherian rings. (Kaplansky's Commutative rings gives a good account of the non-noetherian case.)

Throughout the article,  denotes Krull dimension of a ring and  the height of a prime ideal (i.e., the Krull dimension of the localization at that prime ideal.) Rings are assumed to be commutative except in the last section on dimensions of non-commutative rings.

Basic results 

Let R be a noetherian ring or valuation ring. Then

If R is noetherian, this follows from the fundamental theorem below (in particular, Krull's principal ideal theorem), but it is also a consequence of a more precise result. For any prime ideal  in R,

This can be shown within basic ring theory (cf. Kaplansky, commutative rings).

Since an artinian ring (e.g., a field) has dimension zero, by induction one gets a formula: for an artinian ring R,

Local rings

Fundamental theorem 
Let  be the Poincaré series of the associated graded ring . That is,

where  refers to the length of a module (over an artinian ring ). If  generate I, then their image in  have degree 1 and generate  as -algebra. Since

That is to say,  is a polynomial  in n of degree .

We set . We also set  to be the minimum number of elements of R that can generate an -primary ideal of R. Our ambition is to prove the fundamental theorem:

Since we can take s to be , we already have  from the above. Let  be a chain of prime ideals in R. Let  and x a nonzero nonunit element in D. Since x is not a zero-divisor, we have the exact sequence

The degree bound of the Hilbert-Samuel polynomial now implies that . (This essentially follows from the Artin-Rees lemma; see Hilbert-Samuel function for the statement and the proof.) In , the chain  becomes a chain of length  and so, by inductive hypothesis and again by the degree estimate,

The claim follows. It now remains to show  More precisely, we shall show:

(Notice:  is then -primary.) The proof is omitted. It appears, for example, in Atiyah–MacDonald. But it can also be supplied privately; the idea is to use prime avoidance.

Consequences of the fundamental theorem 
Let  be a noetherian local ring and put . Then
If the equality holds, then R is called a regular local ring.
, since .
(Krull's principal ideal theorem) The height of the ideal generated by elements  in a noetherian ring is at most s. Conversely, a prime ideal of height s is minimal over an ideal generated by s elements. (Proof: Let  be a prime ideal minimal over such an ideal. Then . The converse was shown in the course of the proof of the fundamental theorem.)

Proof: Let  generate a -primary ideal and  be such that their images generate a -primary ideal. Then  for some s. The equality is a straightforward application of the going-down property. Q.E.D.

Proof: If  are a chain of prime ideals in R, then  are a chain of prime ideals in  while  is not a maximal ideal. Thus, . Clearly, .
Since  is then a localization of a principal ideal domain and has dimension at most one, we get  by the previous inequality. Since  is arbitrary, it follows . Q.E.D.

Nagata's altitude formula 

Proof: First suppose  is a polynomial ring. By induction on the number of variables, it is enough to consider the case . Since R is flat over R,

By Noether's normalization lemma, the second term on the right side is:

Next, suppose  is generated by a single element; thus, . If I = 0, then we are already done. Suppose not. Then  is algebraic over R and so . Since R is a subring of R,  and so 

Here, note that the inequality is the equality if R is catenary. Finally, working with a chain of prime ideals, it is straightforward to reduce the general case to the above case. Q.E.D.

Homological methods

Regular rings 
Let R be a noetherian ring. We set ; it is called the global dimension of R.

Assume R is local with residue field k.

Proof: We claim: for any finite R-module M,

But then, by the local criterion for flatness, 
Now,

completing the proof. Q.E.D.

Proof: If , then M is R-free and thus  is -free. Next suppose . Then we have:  as in the remark above. Thus, by induction, it is enough to consider the case . Then there is a projective resolution: , which gives:

But  Hence,  is at most 1. Q.E.D.

Proof: If R is regular, we can write ,  a regular system of parameters. An exact sequence , some f in the maximal ideal, of finite modules, gives us:

But f here is zero since it kills k. Thus,  and consequently . Using this, we get:

We begin with the inductive step. Set ,  among a system of parameters. To show R is regular, it is enough to show  is regular.

The basic step remains. Suppose . We claim  if it is finite. (This would imply that R is a semisimple local ring; i.e., a field.) Since , the maximal ideal  is an associated prime of R; i.e.,  for some nonzero s in R. Since , . Since K is not zero and is free, this implies , which is absurd. Q.E.D.

Proof: Let R be a regular local ring. Then , which is an integrally closed domain. It is a standard algebra exercise to show this implies that R is an integrally closed domain. Now, we need to show every divisorial ideal is principal; i.e., the divisor class group of R vanishes. But, according to Bourbaki, Algèbre commutative, chapitre 7, §. 4. Corollary 2 to Proposition 16, a divisorial ideal is principal if it admits a finite free resolution, which is indeed the case by the theorem. Q.E.D.

Depth 

Let R be a ring and M a module over it. A priori, it is not obvious whether any permutation of a regular sequence is still regular (see the section below for some positive answer.)

Let R be a local Noetherian ring with maximal ideal  and put . For example, we have  consists of zerodivisors on M  is associated with M. By induction, we find

for any associated primes  of M. In particular, . If the equality holds for M = R, R is called a Cohen–Macaulay ring.

Example: A regular Noetherian local ring is Cohen–Macaulay (since a regular system of parameters is an R-regular sequence.)

In general, a Noetherian ring is called a Cohen–Macaulay ring if the localizations at all maximal ideals are Cohen–Macaulay. We note that a Cohen–Macaulay ring is universally catenary. This implies for example that a polynomial ring  is universally catenary since it is regular and thus Cohen–Macaulay.

The basic step n = 0 is trivial. Next, by inductive hypothesis, . Thus, from the exact sequence  and the fact that  kills N, using the inductive hypothesis again, we get

proving. Now, if , then we can find an M-regular sequence of length more than n and so by  we see . It remains to show  if . By we can assume n = 0. Then  is associated with M; thus is in the support of M. On the other hand,  It follows by linear algebra that there is a nonzero homomorphism from N to M modulo ; hence, one from N to M by Nakayama's lemma. Q.E.D.

The Auslander–Buchsbaum formula relates depth and projective dimension.

Since f kills k, the exact sequence yields: for any i,

Note the left-most term is zero if . If , then since  by inductive hypothesis, we see  If , then  and it must be  Q.E.D.

As a matter of notation, for any R-module M, we let

One sees without difficulty that  is a left-exact functor and then let  be its j-th right derived functor, called the local cohomology of R. Since , via abstract nonsense,

This observation proves the first part of the theorem below.

Proof: 1. is already noted (except to show the nonvanishing at the degree equal to the depth of M; use induction to see this) and 3. is a general fact by abstract nonsense. 2. is a consequence of an explicit computation of a local cohomology by means of Koszul complexes (see below).

Koszul complex 

Let R be a ring and x an element in it.

For any R-module M, we then get the complex  with the differential  and let  be its homology. Note:

More generally, given a finite sequence  of elements in a ring R, we form the tensor product of complexes:

and let  its homology. As before,

We now have the homological characterization of a regular sequence.

A Koszul complex is a powerful computational tool. For instance, it follows from the theorem and the corollary

(Here, one uses the self-duality of a Koszul complex; see Proposition 17.15. of Eisenbud, Commutative Algebra with a View Toward Algebraic Geometry.)

Another instance would be

Remark: The theorem can be used to give a second quick proof of Serre's theorem, that R is regular if and only if it has finite global dimension. Indeed, by the above theorem,  and thus . Hence, .

We next use a Koszul homology to define and study complete intersection rings. Let R be a Noetherian local ring. By definition, the first deviation of R is the vector space dimension

where  is a system of parameters. By definition, R is a complete intersection ring if  is the dimension of the tangent space. (See Hartshorne for a geometric meaning.)

Injective dimension and Tor dimensions 
Let R be a ring.

Proof: Suppose . Let M be an R-module and consider a resolution

where  are injective modules. For any ideal I,

Thus, by Baer's criterion, N is injective. We conclude that . Essentially by reversing the arrows, one can also prove the implication in the other way. Q.E.D.

The theorem suggests that we consider a sort of a dual of a global dimension:

It was originally called the weak global dimension of R but today it is more commonly called the Tor dimension of R.

Remark: for any ring R, .

Multiplicity theory

Dimensions of non-commutative rings 

Let A be a graded algebra over a field k. If V is a finite-dimensional generating subspace of A, then we let  and then put

It is called the Gelfand–Kirillov dimension of A. It is easy to show  is independent of a choice of V.

Example: If A is finite-dimensional, then gk(A) = 0. If A is an affine ring, then gk(A) = Krull dimension of A.

See also 
Bass number
Perfect complex
amplitude

Notes

References
 
 Kaplansky, Irving, Commutative rings, Allyn and Bacon, 1970.
 
 
 

Dimension
Commutative algebra